Georgios Koulouris (born 22 July 2004) is a Greek professional footballer who plays as a winger for Super League 2 club PAOK B.

References

2004 births
Living people
Greek footballers
Super League Greece 2 players
PAOK FC players
Association football midfielders
Sportspeople from Corfu
PAOK FC B players